Timber Wolf (Brin Londo) is a character appearing in American comics published by DC Comics. He is a member of the Legion of Super-Heroes from the planet Zoon (spelled in later stories as Zuun), and possesses enhanced strength and agility.

Timber Wolf first appeared in Adventure Comics #327 (December 1964) as Lone Wolf, created by Edmond Hamilton and John Forte. He joined the team in Adventure Comics #372 (Sept 1968).

Fictional character biography
Brin Londo gains his superpowers from experiments conducted on the fictional element Zuunium by his father, Dr. Mar Londo. Karth Arn, a jealous android assistant of Mar Londo, switches identities with Brin, but the plot is eventually revealed when "Lone Wolf" first meets the Legion. He is an early graduate of the Legion Academy. He is thought dead for six months, but is later revealed to have been kidnapped by the villain Tyr (during his captivity his features become more lupine). He has a long-standing romance with fellow Legionnaire Light Lass; they break up due to a misunderstanding when Light Lass finds Timber Wolf embracing Saturn Girl on a frozen asteroid. In Action Comics #377 (July 1969), Timber Wolf battled addiction to the juice of the Lotus Fruit.

In the fourth Legion of Super-Heroes series, Timber Wolf is eventually revealed to have been transformed, without the majority of the Legion realizing, into a giant and mostly mindless dog-like creature, Furball. The transformation was caused by Doctor Regulus, who blasted Timber Wolf with a dose of radiation during his attempt to destroy the sun in the unseen storyline "Black Dawn". Jo Nah (Ultra Boy) hid Brin's identity from the Legion because of Brin's desire to keep his friends from finding out what had he had become.

Furball goes missing resulting in a cadre of the Legion members seeking Furball and Brainiac 5 (Querl Dox). They eventually discover that Darkseid is involved in a scientific process to create a Demigod from a young girl, Aria. The small Legion troop eventually finds Darkseid (who has been holding Aria's father and Sacred Twin brother hostage) and despite Legion's intervention, Darkseid, with the reluctant help of Aria's father, manages to transform Aria into the Gemini Entity using his recently acquired Gemini Matrix. Darkseid is angered by Gemini's unwillingness to do the job he created her for, and also her kindness towards Brin, and restores Brin to his previous Human form, knowing full-well the change from his more bestial state, will eventually kill him.

In Legion of Super-Heroes (vol. 4) Annual #3 (1992), Brainiac 5 discovers that Brin's "condition" was the eventual result of his father's scientific machinations which has deteriorated Brin to the point of a fatal malignancy. Brin decides to wait out the remainder of his life with a small group of Legion friends that he feels are "family". Gemini magically appears and because of her deep friendship with Brin, tries to cure him, by transporting him back to the time before he was experimented on with Zuunium, but accidentally shifts the two of them back to late 20th century Earth which metamorphosizes Brin into a new different hybrid creature somewhere between his original self and the Furball beast.

Subsequently, in the Timber Wolf miniseries, Brin is discovered by a "secret" low-profile underground, government-subsidized group Point Force that recruits "meta-humans without reputations" for undercover operations. He reluctantly joins Point Force, realizing they may be his only hope of finding and rescuing Gemini, who has been kidnapped by the Dominators for use as a god-like power source.

Eventually he is befriended by the "New Blood" super-hero Jamm and was experimented on again by mad scientists who sought to create their own "Timber Wolf". The process transformed Brin again, making him physically wolflike (with brownish-black skin limited fur on his body) but allowed him to retain his mind. Timber Wolf returned to the future and ultimately reconciled with the Legion.

The mute Furball incarnation appeared in Final Crisis: Legion of 3 Worlds #5, along with various Legionnaires from alternate worlds, to battle the Time Trapper at the end of time.

Reboot
In the Post-Zero Hour reboot, Timber Wolf was introduced in the Legion Worlds miniseries. He appears to come from Rimbor, the home planet of Ultra Boy. He is a rival gang leader to Ultra Boy in this continuity (Ultra Boy led a gang, the Emerald Dragons; Timber Wolf led a gang, the Lone Wolves). There is a love triangle between himself, Ultra Boy, and Apparition, as he met Apparition while Ultra Boy was part of the team lost in the Second Galaxy, and formed a strong connection with her. Timber Wolf later realized his feelings for Apparition were only those of a friend, but Ultra Boy remained jealous.

This version of the character had a healing factor. Later, the serum that gave him his powers caused him to mutate into a feral werewolf.

A character named Lupine, who resembled Furball, briefly appeared in an earlier story as a hologram, but due to the creative team changing this was not taken up.

Threeboot
In the 2004 reboot, written by Mark Waid, Timber Wolf appeared originally as an associate of the Legion but subsequently took on full Legion membership. Nothing was revealed about his origin in this series, which ended at issue #50 with several plotlines unresolved. He wasn't shown in his wolfen incarnation in this reboot, but was still prone in his human form to a violent and vicious outburst of rage, especially when Princess Projectra, for whom he carried a torch, is threatened. When Projectra, maddened by the loss of her home planet of Orando, began to blame the whole Legion for her losses, Timber Wolf took her side, going so far as to cover up the savage beating of Phantom Girl at her hands, by sneaking around Princess Projectra and anonymously activating Phantom Girl's Legion Ring alarm only when he was sure of Projectra's own safety.

This version of Timber Wolf has all the powers of the former iterations, but despite being fully human, he has some animalistic traits "carried over" to his otherwise humanoid body, like clawed fingernails and slightly elongated canines.

Post-Infinite Crisis retroboot
The events of the Infinite Crisis miniseries have restored a close analog of the Pre-Crisis Legion to continuity, as seen in "The Lightning Saga" story arc in Justice League of America and Justice Society of America, and in the "Superman and the Legion of Super-Heroes" story arc in Action Comics.  Timber Wolf is included in the Legion and seemingly reconciled with Lightning Lass.

In the crossover story "The Lightning Saga", Timber Wolf is revealed to be alive in the present, alongside six other members of the Legion. He was discovered in Gorilla City, participating in a race riding Velociraptors with no idea who he really is.  Only the name "Lightning Lad" (spoken in Interlac) was able to snap his memory back.  After completing their "secret" mission in the 21st century, he subsequently returns to his own time along with Dream Girl, Sensor Girl, Dawnstar, and Wildfire.

The New 52
In September 2011, The New 52 rebooted DC's continuity. In this new timeline, in a second Legion Lost series, Timber Wolf, along with Chameleon Girl, Wildfire, Dawnstar, Tellus, Tyroc, and Gates are trapped in the 21st century while pursuing a time-travelling genetic terrorist. After exposure to the terrorist's mutagen, Brin's fingernails became hardened, resembling sharp talons which he could expel like projectiles (although not without some pain), regrowing new ones in a matter of seconds.

In the "Watchmen" sequel "Doomsday Clock", Timber Wolf is among the Legion of Super-Heroes members that appear in the present after Doctor Manhattan undid the experiment that erased the Legion of Super-Heroes and Justice Society of America.

Powers and abilities
Originally, Timber Wolf was superhumanly strong, fast and agile, but when the serum changed him into a wolf-like lycanthrope, he gained claws, enhanced senses, the ability to heal quickly from injuries, and even greater strength. As a byproduct of his wolfen form, he is often prone to outbursts of savage fury.

Through exposure to a mutagen while trapped in the 21st century, he gained the ability to fire off his fingernails as sharpened projectiles, regrowing them almost immediately.

Equipment
As a member of the Legion of Super-Heroes, he is provided a Legion Flight Ring. It allows him to fly and protects him from the vacuum of space and other dangerous environments.

In other media
 Timber Wolf makes a cameo appearance in the Justice League Unlimited episode "Far From Home", as one of the captive Legionnaires under the control of the Fatal Five.
 Timber Wolf appears in Legion of Super Heroes (2006), voiced by Shawn Harrison. This version was initially unable to control his wolf form, but eventually gained better control with Saturn Girl's help. However, like his Threeboot incarnation, he retains several animalistic traits even when untransformed.
 Timber Wolf appears in Legion of Super-Heroes (2023), voiced by Robbie Daymond.

Further reading
 The Legion Companion by Glen Cadigan, TwoMorrows Publishing (2003)
 "Examing Bendis’ New Legion of Super-Heroes Group Picture", Comic Book Revolution (July 26, 2019)
 "What to Expect From DC’s New Legion of Super-Heroes" by Mike Cecchini, Den of Geek (Sept 30, 2019)
 The DC Comics Encyclopedia DK Publishing (2004)
 "Who's Who: Timber Wolf", The Legion of Super-Bloggers (2015)

References

External links
 A Hero History Of Timber Wolf

Characters created by Edmond Hamilton
Characters created by John Forte
Comics characters introduced in 1964
DC Comics aliens
DC Comics metahumans
DC Comics characters with accelerated healing
DC Comics characters with superhuman strength
DC Comics characters who can move at superhuman speeds
DC Comics extraterrestrial superheroes
Fictional characters with superhuman senses
DC Comics superheroes
Fictional werewolves